Robert's Drift (or Roberts Drift) is a farmstead located in Mpumalanga, South Africa.

References

Farms in South Africa
Geography of Mpumalanga
Economy of Mpumalanga